Aslı İnandık (born 3 October 1989) is a Turkish actress.

Life and career 
İnandık was born on 3 October 1989 in Ankara. After finishing her primary and secondary education, she studied music at the Ankara Fine Arts High School and later continued her studies at Gazi University. She then studied acting at Ankara University.

While continuing her acting education, she started posting videos of herself character acting on Vine and Instagram and later on YouTube. She started her TV career in 2014 with a small role in the final episode of Yalan Dünya, after Gülse Birsel saw these videos and offered the role to her. She then joined the cast of Güldür Güldür in 2017. She continued her TV appearances with her role as Feraye in Yıldızlar Şahidim and as Saniye Doğan in Benim Tatlı Yalanım.

İnandık made her cinematic debut with the movie Şevkat Yerimdar 2 in 2015, in which she played the character of Buket. In 2018, she appeared on stage in the play Köleler Adası. At this point, she stated that she wanted to write a script about the characters she had previously created and portrayed on social media and shoot a movie based on that. In 2019, she fulfilled this wish and played her first leading role by playing the character of Aslı in the movie Aslı Gibidir, in which she portrayed eight different characters. It was the first time in Turkish cinema's history that an actor played eight different characters in a movie. In the same year, for her role as Aslı in the movie Soluk, she won the Best Supporting Actress award at the 56th Antalya Golden Orange Film Festival.

Theatre 
{| class="wikitable"
!width="50"|Year
!width="190"|Title
!width="140"|Role
|-
| 2018 || Köleler Adası || 
|-
| 2020 || Waterproof || Merlin<ref name="asliaybars_2020">{{cite video |people=Hande Doğandemir, Aslı İnandık, Bala Atabek, Başak Daşman, İdil Sivritepe, Aslı Aybars |year=2020 |title=HANDE DOĞANDEMİR,ASLI İNANDIK,BALA ATABEK,BAŞAK DAŞMAN,İDİL SİVRİTEPE WATERPROOF" OYUNUNU KONUŞTU! |url=https://www.youtube.com/watch?v=xNMDTVuzEA0?t=1012 |format= |language= |publisher=Aslı Aybars |location= |archiveurl= |archivedate= |accessdate=29 October 2020 |via= |isbn= |oclc= |quote= |ref= }}</ref>
|}

 Filmography 
 Television 

 Film 

 Reception 
The characters created and the comments made by İnandık and shared by her on social media have been among the subjects covered by columnists. In his column in the Hürriyet newspaper, Onur Baştürk described the characters of Ms. Salkım, meditation teacher and housewife as "awesome" and "ideal for laughing."
Melike Karakartal wrote that İnandık is "one of the most talented and funny actors in recent years." In another article, she stated that watching İnandık made her "laugh until tears came to her eyes" and that she was "very talented", adding "I haven't met anyone in a long time who can turn into the person she is imitating." She described İnandık's role in the play Waterproof'' as "a very surprising performance with a very different character."

References

External links 
 

1989 births
21st-century Turkish actresses
Actresses from Ankara
Best Supporting Actress Golden Orange Award winners
Gazi University alumni
Living people
Turkish film actresses
Turkish stage actresses
Turkish television actresses
20th-century Turkish actresses